Montgomeryshire is a historic county and former administrative county of Wales.

Montgomeryshire may also refer to:

 District of Montgomeryshire, one of three districts of Powys from 1974 to 1996
 Montgomeryshire (UK Parliament constituency), a constituency of the House of Commons of the Parliament of the United Kingdom
 Montgomeryshire (Senedd constituency), a constituency of the Senedd
 Montgomeryshire Canal

See also
 Shropshire and Montgomeryshire Railway, a railway running from Shrewsbury, England to Llanymynech, Wales
 Montgomery (disambiguation)